La Banda Timbiriche is the 2nd album from Mexican pop music Group Timbiriche. It was released on 1982. The song "Chispita" is the title track for the Telenovela  Chispita  starring Lucerito.

Track listing
 "Rock Del Amor" (03:07)
 "La Banda Timbiriche" (03:14)
 "Ojos De Miel" (03:15)
 "Por Tu Amor" (02:58)
 "Sólo Tú, Sólo Yo" (03:09)
 "Chispita" (02:54)
 "La Vida Es Mejor Cantando" (02:54)
 "México" (03:00)
 "Mamá" (03:02)
 "Cocorito" (03:13)
 "Rocococococanrol" (03:05)

References

1982 albums
Timbiriche albums